Alison Wiley Rochon (born 11 October 1963) is a Canadian former long-distance runner. She was a World Cross Country runner-up in 1983.

Wiley attended Stanford University and competed collegiately for the Stanford Cardinal track team. She was the 1982 winner of the NCAA Division I Outdoor Championship title in the 3000 metres. She won seven NCAA All-American honours, which included a runner-up spot in the 1984 NCAA 5000 metres and three straight second-place finishes at the NCAA Women's Division I Cross Country Championship from 1982 to 1984. She was inducted into the Stanford Cardinal hall of fame in 2006.

Internationally, her greatest success was at the 1983 IAAF World Cross Country Championships where she became Canada's first ever medallist at the competition, taking the silver medal behind Norway's Grete Waitz. As a result, she also led the Canadian women's team to the bronze medals. She also competed at the 1983 World Championships in Athletics that year, coming 15th in the 3000 metres, and participated at the 1981 IAAF World Cross Country Championships. Her sole other international medal was a 3000 m bronze medal at the 1989 Jeux de la Francophonie, finishing a fraction of a second behind Rwanda's Marcianne Mukamurenzi.

She was twice a winner at the Canadian Track and Field Championships, taking the 3000 m title in 1981 and 1988.

International competitions

National titles
Canadian Track and Field Championships
3000 metres: 1981, 1988

References

External links

Living people
1963 births
Canadian female long-distance runners
Stanford Cardinal women's track and field athletes
World Athletics Championships athletes for Canada
Stanford Cardinal women's cross country runners